Chandra Sekhar Yeleti (born 4 March 1973) is an Indian film director known for his works in Telugu cinema. He made his directorial debut with the Neo-noir crime film, Aithe, which received the National Film Award for Best Feature Film in Telugu, and the Nandi Award for Best Story for that year. Another neo-noir film Anukokunda Oka Roju garnered two State Nandi Awards, including Best Screenplay for Yeleti.

Early life
He was born in Tuni on 4 March 1973. He studied in Ganavaram St.Johns until 10th grade.

Career 
He worked as an assistant Director under his cousin Gangaraju Gunnam  for Little Soldiers. He had directed the first 10 episodes of Amrutham TV series.

After working as an assistant director, Chandra Sekhar Yeleti made his debut with a small budget film titled "Aithe". That film was made on a budget of about  1.5 crores and performed well commercially, with a box office of collection of 6 crore rupees. After almost two years he made his next film "Anukokunda Oka Roju". Both the films were produced by Gunnam Gangaraju & Venkat Dega. After a gap of two years, he directed his third film with Gopichand as the protagonist, titled "Okkadunnadu". In 2009, Yeleti directed his fourth film "Prayanam" with Manchu Manoj as the lead actor. After four years, Yeleti teamed again with Gopichand with an adventure movie Sahasam.

In October 2015, Yeleti met Mohanlal and narrated a family subject to him. The plot was green-lit by Mohanlal, and Yeleti started production work for the Telugu drama thriller, titled Manamantha with an ensemble supporting cast including Gautami, Viswant Duddumpudi, Nassar, Chandra Mohan, Vennela Kishore, Gollapudi Maruti Rao, Paruchuri Venkateswara Rao, Brahmaji, L. B. Sriram, and Ayappa P. Sharma. The movie received positive reviews from both critics and audience upon release on 5 August 2016.

Personal life
He got married on 19 May. Filmmaker Gunnam Gangaraju is his cousin.

Filmography

Films

Television
Amrutham (2001–2007): Directed 10 episodes

Awards
National Film Awards
National Film Award for Best Feature Film in Telugu - Aithe

Nandi Awards
Nandi Award for Best Feature Film (Silver) - Anukokunda Oka Roju
Nandi Award for Best Screenplay Writer - Anukokunda Oka Roju
Nandi Award for Best Story Writer - Aithe
Nandi Special Jury Award - Manamantha

References

External links

Nandi Award winners
Living people
1973 births
21st-century Indian film directors
Malayalam film directors
Telugu film directors
Indian male screenwriters
Film directors from Andhra Pradesh
People from East Godavari district
Telugu screenwriters
Screenwriters from Andhra Pradesh